Myrmecocichla is a genus of passerine birds in the Old World chat and flycatcher family Muscicapidae.
 
The genus contains the following species:
 Sooty chat (Myrmecocichla nigra)
 Anteater chat (Myrmecocichla aethiops)
 Congo moor chat (Myrmecocichla tholloni)
 Ant-eating chat (Myrmecocichla formicivora)
 Rüppell's black chat (Myrmecocichla melaena)
 Mountain wheatear (Myrmecocichla monticola) (formerly placed in Oenanthe)
 Arnot's chat (Myrmecocichla arnoti) (formerly placed in Pentholaea)
 Ruaha chat (Myrmecocichla collaris)

References

 
Bird genera
 
Taxonomy articles created by Polbot